Ryan Blackadder (born 11 October 1983) is a Scottish footballer who plays for Glenrothes FC. He has also played for Raith Rovers, Hamilton Accies and East Fife.

External links

1983 births
Living people
Footballers from Kirkcaldy
Scottish footballers
Association football midfielders
Raith Rovers F.C. players
Hamilton Academical F.C. players
East Fife F.C. players
Scottish Football League players
Ballingry Rovers F.C. players